The Rotoitidae are a very small family of rare, relictual parasitic wasps in the superfamily Chalcidoidea, known primarily from fossils (14 extinct species in two genera, Baeomorpha and Taimyromorpha). Only two extant species are known, each in its own genus, one from New Zealand and one from Chile, and little is known about their biology. Females of the Chilean species, Chiloe micropteron, have their wings reduced to tiny bristles. Most fossil species are known from the Late Cretaceous (Santonian) Taimyr amber of Russia and Late Cretaceous (Campanian) Canadian amber, but one species, Baeomorpha liorum is known from the mid Creaceous (late Albian-earliest Cenomanian) Burmese amber.

Rotoitids are very close to the base of the chalcidoid family tree, presently considered to be the first "branch" taxon after the Mymaridae.

References

External links
Universal Chalcidoid Database

Fauna of Chile
Chalcidoidea
Insects of South America
Apocrita families